Skylands may refer to:
 Skylands, the setting of Skylanders
 Skylands, the second zone of the 2009 video game Henry Hatsworth in the Puzzling Adventure
 Skylands (estate), an estate property located in New Jersey
 Skylands Region, a region in New Jersey, the states most northern region
 Martha Stewart's estate in Seal Harbour, Maine

See also
Skyland